Cavallaro may refer to:

People
 Alessandro Cavallaro (1980- ) — Italian sprinter
 Carmen Cavallaro (1913–1989) — American pianist
 Cosimo Cavallaro (1961- ) — Canadian artist, filmmaker and sculptor
 Gina Cavallaro — reporter for the Army Times
 Salvatore John Cavallaro (1920–1943) — US Navy Officer for whom a ship was named
 Vincent Cavallaro (1912-1985) — American Artist

Other
 USS Cavallaro (APD-128) (1942-2000) — US Navy Ship, now decommissioned